All the Hits may refer to:

 All the Hits (Keith Martin album), 2003
 All the Hits (Bonnie Tyler album), 2013
 All the Hits Tour (Elton John), a 2015 concert tour by Elton John
 All the Hits Tour (Lionel Richie and Mariah Carey), a 2017 concert tour by Lionel Richie and Mariah Carey

See also 
 All Hits, a 2001 album by All Saints